Vittorio Mezzogiorno (16 December 1941 – 7 January 1994) was an Italian actor.

Biography
Mezzogiorno was born in Cercola, the youngest of seven children. His older brother Vincenzo, who wanted to become a director, introduced him to the theatre.

At 18, Mezzogiorno enrolled at the university and began medical studies before choosing law. Then he had his first experience as an actor at the Teatro S. theatre where he recited texts by Samuel Beckett and Eugène Ionesco. Desiring to improve his diction he spent long nights exercising his voice with extracts of the Penal Code. In 1962, at age 21, he played Estragon in Waiting for Godot at the "Piccolo Teatro" of Naples.

In 1966–1967, he joined the troupe of Eduardo De Filippo and obtained his university diploma. In 1969, he met actress Cecilia Sacchi. Their collaboration quickly turned to a romantic relationship and they were married on 14 October 1972. On 9 November 1974, their only child Giovanna Mezzogiorno, who also became an actress, was born.

The family then settled in Rome where Mezzogiorno fully dedicated himself to the theatre.

In 1983, Jean-Jacques Beineix opened the doors of French cinema with Moon in the Gutter where he acted alongside Gérard Depardieu and Nastassja Kinski, but the real recognition came the same year in L'Homme blessé, a film by Patrice Chéreau, where he played Jean, a homosexual. Meanwhile, Mezzogiorno moved to Paris.

More than ten hours of entertainment, a year of rehearsals, six months of training in martial arts: the challenge of Peter Brooks Mahabharata, transcription of the long epic of Hindu mythology. Mezzogiorno was Arjuna, the son of Indra. It was first performed at the Boulbon Quarry in 1985 at the Festival d'Avignon and lasted all night. After a show at the Bouffes du Nord, it went on tour until the end of 1986 (Athens, Prato, Barcelona, Madrid and Lyon). The Mahabharata in English was back on the road in 1988: Zurich, Los Angeles, New York, Perth, Adelaide, Copenhagen, Glasgow, and finally Tokyo. In 1989, the movie adaptation was produced. In all, Mezzogiorno has played Arjuna for 6 years on 4 continents.

In 1990, Vittorio Mezzogiorno returned to Italy and settled in Milan. He became a star of the small screen by interpreting the Commissioner Davide Licata in the series La piovra which deals with the Mafia. In 1992, he played with his wife at the Teatro Stabile di Parma. This was to be his last appearances.

He died of cancer in Milan at the age of 52.

Filmography

1959: Audace colpo dei soliti ignoti (by Nanni Loy) - Arresting Officer (uncredited)
1972: Il caso Pisciotta (by Eriprando Visconti) - Agente Beretta
1973: Non ho tempo (by Ansano Giannarelli)
1975: La Cecilia (by Jean-Louis Comolli) - Luigi
1975: Il marsigliese (by Giacomo Battiato)
1976: Extra (TV Mini-Series, by Daniele D'Anza) - Tom Hyers
1976: Basta che non si sappia in giro (by Luigi Magni) - Lupo (segment "Il superiore")
1976: Bloody Payroll (by Mario Caiano) - Walter
1976: La Orca (by Eriprando Visconti)
1977: Stunt Squad (by Domenico Paolella) - Valli
1977: L'uomo di Corleone (by Duilio Coletti)
1979: Il Giorni dei Cristalli (TV Movie, by Giacomo Battiato) - Michele Paita
1979: A Dangerous Toy (by Giuliano Montaldo) - Sauro
1979: Martin Eden (Italian TV serie by Giacomo Battiato) - Cheeseface
1980: Speed Cross (by Stelvio Massi) - Nicola
1980: Cafè Express (by Nanni Loy) - Amitrano, altro borsaiolo
1980:  (by Gianni Barcelloni) - Erostrato
1980: Arrivano i bersaglieri (by Luigi Magni) - Alfonso
1980: Doppio sogno dei Sigg X (by Anna Maria Tato)
1981: Three Brothers (by Francesco Rosi) - Rocco Giuranna / Young Donato
1981: Car Crash (by Antonio Margheriti) - Nick
1981: E noi non faremo karakiri (by Francesco Longo) - Matteo
1981: The Fall of the Rebel Angels (by Marco Tullio Giordana) - Vittorio
1982: Un asila al Patibulo (by Giuliana Berlinguer)
1983: Moon in the Gutter (by Jean-Jacques Beineix) - Newton Channing - le frère à la dérive de Loretta
1983: Nostalgia (by Andrei Tarkovsky) - (uncredited)
1983: The House of the Yellow Carpet (by Carlo Lizzani) - Antonio
1983: L'Homme blessé (by Patrice Chéreau) - Jean Lerman
1984:  (by ) - Gorian
1984: La Garce (by Christine Pascal) - Max Halimi
1985: Un foro nel parabrezza (by Sauro Scavolini) - Eugenio
1987: Fuegos (by Alfredo Arias) - El Gringo
1987: Jenatsch (by Daniel Schmid) - Jörg Jenatsch
1988: Contrainte par corps (by Serge Leroy) - Kasta
1989: La Révolution française (by Robert Enrico) - Jean-Paul Mara, dit Marat
1989: The Mahabharata (TV Mini-Series, by Peter Brook) - Arjuna
1991: The Conviction (by Marco Bellochio) - Lorenzo Colajanni
1991: Scream of Stone (by Werner Herzog) - Roccia Innerkofler
1991: Reflections in a Dark Sky (by Salvatore Maira)
1992: Golem, the Spirit of the Exile (by Amos Gitai) - Le Maharal
1992: Hors saison (by Daniel Schmid) - Uncle Paul
1993: Caccia alle mosche (by Angelo Longoni) - (final film role)

Awards 
1979: Nastro d'Argento for Il Giocattolo
1981: Nastro d'Argento for Tre Fratelli
1990: Ciak d'Oro for Scream of Stone

References

External links 
 

1941 births
1994 deaths
People from Cercola
Italian male actors
Nastro d'Argento winners
20th-century Italian male actors
Deaths from cancer in Lombardy